Lasse Schlüter (born 27 April 1992) is a German professional footballer who plays as a left-back.

References

External links
 Profile at kicker.de
 

1992 births
Living people
Footballers from Hamburg
German footballers
Association football fullbacks
Hamburger SV II players
FC St. Pauli II players
FSV Wacker 90 Nordhausen players
FC Energie Cottbus players
Eintracht Braunschweig players
3. Liga players
Regionalliga players
2. Bundesliga players